"Faith (In the Power of Love)" is a song by Zambian-born singer Rozalla. It was released in April 1991 as the third single from her second album, Everybody's Free (1992). The single first charted in the UK in April 1991, reaching No. 65. The single was re-released in November of that year after the success of her previous single, "Everybody's Free (To Feel Good)", peaking this time at No. 11. The song met with similar success throughout the rest of Europe, although some countries skipped this release in favour of her next single "Are You Ready to Fly". The song did not see a release in the US until 1993, when it peaked at No. 4 on the Billboard Hot Dance Club Play chart.

Critical reception
AllMusic editor William Cooper wrote that on the song, Rozalla "manages to squeeze in more house-oriented grooves". Larry Flick from Billboard called it "yet another potential No. 1 hit. Song-wise, this is far more satisfying in melodic structure and lyrical content than the previous "Are You Ready To Fly." Its anthemic stance is given depth by a vocal that is not nearly as over the top as in the past." British music magazine Fact put "Faith (In the Power of Love)" at 20 in their list of "21 Diva-House Belters That Still Sound Incredible" in 2014. Joe Muggs said, "Never a massive pop hit like ‘Everybody's Free’ (though it did make it to number 11), and yeah alright, this one is pretty high in sugar – but go on, give yourself up to it and revel in the fact there was a period of pop culture when these lyrics were not only acceptable but normal." 

James Hamilton from Music Week described the track as a "girl wailed jumpy powerful galloper." A reviewer from Record Mirror wrote that "Rozalla's got a great voice and the Band Of Gypsies produce a fine house backing for her". The reviewer added further that "like 'Born to Love Ya', this starts with uplifting piano and continues in much same garagey vein. It's got a superb searing '70s synth horn melody, memorable chorus chants, a vibesy bridge and bright beats." Marc Andrews from Smash Hits stated that "it should easily find itself a cheery wee home inside the charts for Zimbabwe's most famous daughter."

Remixes
"Faith (In the Power of Love)" was remixed in 2004 by Way Out West and again in 2006 by Ian Carey.

Charts

Weekly charts

Year-end charts

Release history

References

1991 singles
1991 songs
Pulse 8 singles
Rozalla songs
Songs written by Nigel Swanston